Vakhrushev (Tomarikishi-mura) is an urban locality (an urban-type settlement) in the Poronaysky District in Sakhalin Oblast, Russia. Population: 
The village was named Vakhrushev, in honor of the former Minister of Coal Industry of the USSR Vasily Vakhrushev .

References

Urban-type settlements in Sakhalin Oblast